This is the discography for the American jazz musician Bobby Hutcherson.

As leader 
Aforegoing dates are the year of recording.

Blue Note records

 1963 The Kicker (1999)
 1965 Dialogue (1965)
 1965 Components (1966)
 1966 Happenings (1967)
 1966 Stick-Up! (1968)
 1967 Oblique (1979) – Japan only
 1968 Patterns (1980) – as LT series
 1968 Total Eclipse (1969)
 1965-68 Spiral (1979) – as LT series
 1969 Medina (1980) – as LT series
 1969 Now! (1970)
 1970 San Francisco featuring Harold Land (1971)
 1971 Head On (1971) – reissued with unreleased material 2008
 1972 Natural Illusions (1972)

 1973 Bobby Hutcherson Live at Montreux (1974) – live
 1974 Cirrus (1974)
 1975 Linger Lane (1975)
 1975 Inner Glow (1980) – Japan only
 1975 Montara (1975)
 1976 Waiting (1976)
 1976 The View from the Inside (1976)
 1977 Knucklebean (1977)
 1993 Manhattan Moods with McCoy Tyner (1994)
 2014? Enjoy the View (2014)
 compilation The Best of the Blue Note Years (2001)

Columbia Records
 1978 Highway One (1978)
 1979 Conception: The Gift of Love (1979)
 1979 Un Poco Loco (1980)
 compilation The Best of Bobby Hutcherson (1981)

Landmark Records
 1984 Good Bait (1985)
 1985 Color Schemes (1986)
 1986 In the Vanguard (1987) – live
 1988 Cruisin' the 'Bird (1988)
 1989 Ambos Mundos (1989)
 1991 Mirage (1991)
 compilation Landmarks: A Compilation (1984–1986) (1991)

Other Labels

 1969 Blow Up with Harold Land (Jazz Music Yesterday, 1990) – live
 1980 Little B's Poem (Live at E.J.'s, 1999) – live
 1981-82 Solo / Quartet (Contemporary, 1982)
 1982 Farewell Keystone (Theresa, 1988) – live
 1983 Four Seasons with George Cables, et al. (Timeless, 1985)
 1993 Acoustic Masters II with Craig Handy, et al. (Atlantic, 1994)
 1998 Skyline (Verve, 1999)
 2006 For Sentimental Reasons (Kind of Blue, 2007)
 2009 Wise One (Kind of Blue, 2009) – John Coltrane tribute
 2009 Somewhere in the Night (Kind of Blue, 2012) – live
 compilation Silver Rondo (UpFront, 1975)
 compilation Procession (UpFront, 1976)

As a member 

SFJAZZ Collective
 Live 2004 Inaugural Concert Tour (SFJazz, 2004)
 SFJAZZ Collective (Nonesuch, 2005) – recorded in 2004
 Live 2005 2nd Annual Concert Tour (SFJazz, 2005)
 SFJAZZ Collective 2 (Nonesuch, 2006) – recorded in 2005
 Live 2006 3rd Annual Concert Tour (SFJazz, 2006)
 Live 2007 4th Annual Concert Tour (SFJazz, 2007)

Timeless All Stars
 It's Timeless (Timeless, 1982) – live at Keystone Korner
 Timeless Heart (Timeless, 1983)
 Essence (Delos, 1986)
 Time for the Timeless All Stars (Early Bird, 1991)

As sideman 

With Donald Byrd
 Ethiopian Knights (Blue Note, 1972) – recorded in 1971
 A City Called Heaven (Landmark, 1991)

With Eric Dolphy
 Iron Man (Douglas, 1968) – recorded in 1963
 Conversations (Fred Miles, 1963)
 Out to Lunch! (Blue Note, 1964)

With Bruce Forman
 Full Circle (Concord, 1984)
 There are Times (Concord, 1987)

With Kenny Garrett
 Happy People (Warner Bros., 2001)
 Beyond the Wall (Nonesuch, 2006)

With Dexter Gordon
 Gettin' Around (Blue Note, 1966) – recorded in 1965
 Sophisticated Giant (Columbia, 1977)
 The Other Side of Round Midnight (Blue Note, 1985)

With Grant Green
 Idle Moments (Blue Note, 1965) – recorded in 1963
 Street of Dreams (Blue Note, 1967) – recorded in 1964

With Al Grey
Snap Your Fingers (Argo, 1962)
Night Song (Argo, 1962)
Having a Ball (Argo, 1963)

With John Hicks
 John Hicks (Theresa; Evidence, 1982)
 In Concert (Theresa; Evidence, 1986) – recorded in 1984

With Andrew Hill
 Judgment! (Blue Note, 1963)
 Andrew!!! (Blue Note, 1964)
 Eternal Spirit (Blue Note, 1989)

With Freddie Hubbard
 Keystone Bop: Sunday Night (Prestige, 1981)
 Keystone Bop Vol. 2: Friday & Saturday (Prestige, 1996) – recorded in 1981

With Harold Land
 The Peace-Maker (Cadet, 1967)
 A New Shade of Blue (Mainstream, 1971)
 Choma (Mainstream, 1971)
 Xocia's Dance (Muse, 1981)

With Jackie McLean
 One Step Beyond (Blue Note, 1963)
 Destination... Out! (Blue Note, 1964)
 Action Action Action (Blue Note, 1964)

With Duke Pearson
 The Phantom (Blue Note, 1968)
 I Don't Care Who Knows It (Blue Note, 1969)

With Woody Shaw
 Master of the Art (Elektra/Musician, 1982)
 Night Music (Elektra/Musician, 1982)

With Archie Shepp
 On This Night (Impulse!, 1965)
 New Thing at Newport (Impulse!, 1966) – live

With McCoy Tyner
 Time for Tyner (Blue Note, 1969) – recorded in 1968
 Sama Layuca (Milestone, 1974)
 Together (Milestone, 1979) – recorded in 1978
 Quartets 4 X 4 (Milestone, 1980)
 La Leyenda de La Hora (Columbia, 1981)
 Manhattan Moods (Blue Note, 1993)
 Land of Giants (Telarc, 2003)

With Tony Williams
 Life Time (Blue Note, 1964)
 Foreign Intrigue (Blue Note, 1985)

With Gerald Wilson
 Everywhere (Pacific Jazz, 1968) – recorded in 1967-68
 California Soul (World Pacific, 1968)
 Eternal Equinox (World Pacific, 1969)

With others
 Curtis Amy & Frank Butler, Groovin' Blue (Pacific Jazz, 1961) – recorded in 1960-61
 The Aquarians, Jungle Grass (Uni, 1969)
 Kenny Barron, Other Places (Verve, 1993)
 Bayete, Worlds Around the Sun  (Prestige, 1972)
 Dave Burns, Warming Up (Vanguard, 1962)
 George Cables, Cables' Vision (Contemporary, 1980) – recorded in 1979
 Stanley Cowell, Brilliant Circles (Freedom Records, 1972) – recorded in 1969
 Joey DeFrancesco, Organic Vibes (Concord, 2006)
 Smith Dobson, Sasha Bossa (Quartet, 1988)
 Chico Freeman, Destiny's Dance (Contemporary, 1982) – recorded in 1981
 Luis Gasca, Collage (Fantasy, 1975)
 Herbie Hancock, Round Midnight (Columbia, 1986) – recorded in 1985
 John Handy, New View (Columbia, 1967)
 Roy Haynes, Thank You Thank You (Galaxy, 1977)
 Eddie Henderson, Sunburst (Blue Note, 1975)
 Joe Henderson, Mode for Joe (Blue Note, 1966)
 Stix Hooper, The World Within (MCA, 1979)
 Ron Jefferson, Love Lifted Me (Pacific Jazz, 1962)
 Barney Kessel, Feeling Free (Contemporary, 1969)
 Osamu Kitajima, Masterless Samurai (Headfirst, 1980)
 Prince Lasha & Sonny Simmons, Firebirds (Contemporary, 1968) – recorded in 1967
 John Lewis, Slavic Smile (Baystate, 1982)
 Abbey Lincoln, Wholly Earth (Verve, 1998)
 Eddie Marshall, Dance of the Sun (Timeless, 1977)
 Les McCann, "Oat Meal" b/w "One More Ham Hock Please" (Pacific Jazz, 1961) 45rpm 7" single 
 Billy Mitchell, This Is Billy Mitchell (Smash, 1962)
 Grachan Moncur III, Evolution (Blue Note, 1964) – recorded in 1963
 Frank Morgan, Reflections (Contemporary, 1989) – recorded in 1988
 Lee Morgan, The Procrastinator (Blue Note, 1978)– recorded in 1967-69
 Grassella Oliphant, The Grass Roots (Atlantic, 1965)
 John Patton, Let 'em Roll (Blue Note, 1965)
 Lou Rawls, At Last (Blue Note, 1989)
 Dianne Reeves, I Remember (Blue Note, 1988)
 Sonny Rollins, No Problem (Milestone, 1981)
 Ted Rosenthal, Calling You (CTI, 1992)
 Joe Sample, Roles (MCA, 1987)
 Pharoah Sanders, Rejoice (Theresa, 1981)
 Sonny Stitt, Just in Case You Forgot How Bad He Really Was (32 Jazz, 1981)
 Harold Vick, The Caribbean Suite (RCA Victor, 1966)
 Larry Vuckovich, Blue Balkan (Inner City, 1980)
 Cedar Walton, Among Friends (Theresa, 1989) – recorded in 1982
 Paula West, Come What May (Hi Horse, 2001)
 Various Artists, The New Wave in Jazz (Impulse!, 1965)

References 

Discographies of American artists
Jazz discographies